Madan Ghosh (born 21 May 1956) is an Indian former cricketer. He played fourteen first-class matches for Bengal between 1977 and 1984.

See also
 List of Bengal cricketers

References

External links
 

1956 births
Living people
Indian cricketers
Bengal cricketers
Cricketers from Kolkata